Adorno's Practical Philosophy: Living Less Wrongly is a 2013 book by the philosopher Fabian Freyenhagen, in which the author reconstructs and defends the philosopher Theodor W. Adorno's practical philosophy and tries to respond to the charge that Adorno's thought has no practical import or coherent ethics.

References

External links 
 Adorno's Practical Philosophy: Living Less Wrongly

2013 non-fiction books
Cambridge University Press books
Ethics books
Works about Theodor W. Adorno